The following is a list of governors and other local administrators of the city of Melilla, a Spanish exclave in North Africa. The list encompass the period from 1497 until 1995.

List

Governors
    
1497–1498: Goméz Suárez
1498–1500: Pedro de Estopiñán y Virués
1500–1510: Gonzalo Mariño de Rivera (Ribelles)
1510–1513: Bernavé Pinelo
1513–1518: Fernando de Abreu
1518–1522: Gonzalo Mariño de Rivera (Ribelles)
1522–1535: Francisco de Medina Monsivay
1535–1542: Cristóbal Dabrés (d'Abreu)
1543–1546: Hernando de Jérez
1546–1554: Juan de Perea
1554–1559: Alonso de Urrea
1559–1568: Pedro Venegas de Córdoba
1568–1571: Francisco Sánchez de Córdoba
1571–1595: Antonio de Tejada
1595–1596: Jerónimo de los Barrios
1596–1603: Martín Dávalos y Padilla
1603–1611: Pedro de Herrida
1612–1617: Domingo de Dieguez
1617–1618: Gaspar de Mondragón
1618–1619: Domingo de Ochoa
1619–1620: Diego de Leyva
1620–1622: Francisco Rodríguez de Sanabria 
1622–1624: Francisco Ruíz 
1625–1632: Luis de Sotomayor
1632–1633: Pedro Moreo
1633–1635: Tomás Mejía de Escobedo
1635–1637: Pedro Moreo
1637–1648: Gabriel de Peñalosa y Estrada 
1649: Luis de Sotomayor
1649: Andrés del Carte y Murisábal (interim)
1649–1650: Jordán Jerez
1651: Juan Peñalosa (interim)
1651–1655: Pedro Palacio y Guevara
1655–1656: Diego de Arce
1656–1667: Luis de Velázquez y Angulo
1667–1669: Juan de Peñalosa y Estrada
1669–1672: Francisco Osorio de Astorga
1672–1674: Diego de Arce
1674–1675: Pedro Moreo
1675–1680: José Frias
1680–1683: Diego Toscano y Brito
1684–1686: Diego Pacheco y Arce
1687: Francisco López Moreno
1687–1688: Antonio Domínguez de Durán
1688–1691: Bernabé Ramos y Miranda
1692–1697: Antonio de Zúñiga y de la Cerda
1697–1703: Domingo de Canal y Soldevila
1704–1707: Blas de Trincheria
1707–1711: Diego de Flores
1711–1714: Juan Jerónimo Ungo de Velasco
1714–1715: Patricio Gómez de la Hoz
1715–1716: Pedro Sansón (acting)  
1716–1719: Pedro Borrás
1719: Francisco Ibáñez y Rubalcava
1719–1730: Alonso de Guevara y Vasconcelos
1730–1732: Juan Andrés del Thoso        
1731–1732: Francisco de Alba (interim)
1732–1757: Antonio Villalba y Angulo
1757–1758: Francisco de Alba (interim)
1758–1767: Narciso Vázquez Nicuesa
1767–1772: Miguel Fernández de Saavedra
1772–1777: José Carrión y Andrade
1777: Nicolás Quijano
1777–1780: Bernardo Tortosa
1780–1782: Antonio Manso
1782–1786: José Granados
1786–1788: José Naranjo
1788–1798: José Rivera
1798–1800: Fernando Moyano
1800–1814: Ramón Conti
1814: Manuel Ibarra (interim)
1814–1821: Jacinto Díaz Capilla
1821–1823: Antonio Mateos Malpartida (interim)
1823–1824: Juan Pérez de Hacho y Oliván (interim)
1824–1826: Luis Cappa Rioseco
1826–1829: Manuel García
1829–1830: Juan Serrano y Reyna (interim)
1830–1835: Luis Cappa Rioseco (2nd time)
1835–1836: Lázaro Garcia del Real (interim)
1836–1838: Rafael Delgado y Moreno
1838–1839: Gregorio Álvarez y Pérez (president of the royal governing junta, Carlist rebellion)
1839: Ramón Robere (interim)
1839–1847: Demetrio María de Benito y Hernández
1847: Justo Martín de Villota (interim)
1847: Antonio Lopez de Mendoza (interim)
1847–1848: Manuel Arcaya
1848–1850: Ignácio Chacón
1850–1854: José Eustaquio de Castro y Mendez 
1854–1856: Manuel Buceta del Villar
1856: José Muñoz (interim)
1856–1858: José Morcillo y Ezquerra
1858: Francisco Ceballos (interim)
1858–1860: Manuel Buceta del Villar
1860–1861: Luis Lemni Demandre de la Breche
1861–1862: Felipe Ginovés Espinar
1862–1863: Manuel Álvarez Maldonado
1863–1864: Thomás O'Ryan y Vázquez
1864–1866: Bartolomé de Benavides y Campuzano
1866–1868: José Salcedo y González
1868–1871: Pedro Beaumont y Peralta
1871–1873: Bernardo Alemañy y Perote
1873–1879: Andrés Cuadra y Bourman
1879–1880: Manuel Macías y Casado
1880: Angel Navascués
1880–1881: Evaristo García y Reyna
1881–1886: Manuel Macías y Casado
1886–1887: Teodoro Camino y Alcobendas
1887–1888: Mariano de la Iglesia y Guillén
1888: Juan Villalonga y Soler
1888–1889: Rafael Assin y Bazán
1889–1891: José Mirelis y González
1891: Santos Asbert Laguna (interim)
1891–1893: Juan García y Margallo
1893: Manuel Macías y Casado
1893–1894: Juan Arolas y Esplugues
1894: Juan Valverde Carrillo (interim)
1894–1895: Rafael Cerero
1895–1898: José Alcántara Pérez
1898: Francisco Salinero Bellver
1898–1899: Fernando Alameda y Liancourt
1899: Francisco Salinero Bellver (interim)
1899–1904: Venancio Hernández y Fernández
1904: Vicente Muñíz Cuadrado (interim)
1904–1905: Manuel Serrano y Ruíz
1905: Enrique Segura y Campoy
1905: Vicente Muñíz Cuadrado (interim)
1905–1910: José Marina Vega
1910–1912: José García Aldave

Mayors (Presidentes de la Junta de Arbitrios)

1912: Máximo Ramos y Orcajo
1913: Luis Aizpuru y Mondéjar
1913: José Villalba Riquelme
1913: Fernando Moltó Ocampo
1913: José Villalba Riquelme
1913: Juan Montero Montero
1913–191.: José Villalba Riquelme
191.–1916: Domingo Arráiz de la Conderena
1916: José Sousa del Real
1916: Federico Monteverde Cedano
1916: Ramón Franch Tresserra
1916–1917: Luis Jiménez Pajarero
1917–1920: Federico Monteverde Cedano
1920–1921: Felipe Navarro Ceballos-Escalera, barón de Casa Davalillos
1921–1922: Miguel Fresneda Mengíbar    
1922: Julio de Ardanaz y Crespo
1922: Jerónimo Palou                             
1922–1925: José García Aldave             
1925: Soriano (acting)          
1925–1927: José García Aldave         
1927: Miguel González Carrasco

Chairmen of the Municipal Junta

1927–1928: Francisco Calvo Lucía
1928–1931: Cándido Lobera Girela

Mayors (Alcaldes)

1931: Juan Mendizábal Echevarría
1931: Antonio Díez Martín
1931–1933: Miguel Bernardi Tevar
1933–1936: Antonio García Vallejo
1936: Antonio Díez Martín
1936–1937: José Marfil García
1937–1939: Octavio Martínez Cayuela
1939–1940: José Marfil García
1940: José Lamas Calvelo
1940–1950: Rafael Álvarez Claro
1950–1953: Eduardo García Sánchez
1953–1956: Gabriel de Beníto Angulo
1956–1957: Manuel Requena Cañones
1957–1958: Miguel Gómez Morales (acting)
1958–1959: Juan Villalón Dombriz
1960–1962: Luís Carvajal Arrieta
1963: José Cabanillas Rojas
1963–1964: Antonio Romaguera Barceló (interim)
1964–1971: Francisco Mir Berlanga
1971–1972: Roberto Moreno Valdés (interim)
1972–1975: Eduardo León Solá
1975–1979: Luis Cobreros Acero
1979–1983: Rafael Ginel Cañamaque
1981–1991: Gonzalo Hernández Martínez
1991–1995: Ignacio Velázquez Rivera 

For continuation after 1995, see: Mayor-President of Melilla

Sources
World Statesmen.org
 

Melilla
Politics of Spain
Melilla
Melilla
governors